Regulation of motorcycle access on freeways is regulation of the freeway (controlled-access highway) and expressway (limited-access road) access of motorcycles in most nations.

Access regulation 
Freeway access regulation for motorcycles differs from country to country. In most countries, regulation is based on engine displacement.

List of speed limits

See also 
 Freeway motorcycling restrictions in East Asia
 Speed limits by country

References 

Limited-access roads
Controlled-access highways
Motorcycle regulation